The Caristii were a pre-Roman tribe settled in the north of the Iberian Peninsula, in what today are known as the historical territories of Biscay and Álava, in the Basque Country, northern Spain.

Origins
Their historical territory today corresponds very well with the extension of the Biscayan dialect of the Basque language, however it is discussed whether the Caristii were actually Aquitanians, related to the Vascones, or if they were Celts, related to tribes such as the Cantabri and Celtiberians and that later suffered a Basquisation.

History 

The Caristii are first mentioned by Roman sources; Pliny the Elder names them Carietes and places them in the Basque interior territories, what today is the southernmost regions of the Basque Country, while Ptolemy places them between the river Deba and Nervión, present-day provinces of Biscay and Gipuzkoa, with a territory triangle-shaped, reaching the city of Vitoria by the south. Their territory limited with the Varduli at east, Cantabri at west and Autrigones at southwest.

Their main cities were Tullica, probably Tuyo, Erriberagoitia in the banks of the river Zadorra; Suessatio, which could be present-day Arkaia; and Veleia or Velegia, the last two were located near the Roman road from Bordeaux to Astorga.; another city in their land was Vesperies, on the Atlantic coast (south coast of the Bay of Biscay). The toponyms of their cities are of Indo-European origin (Celtic or Proto-Celtic languages), Tullica (from "Tullo", valley), Suessatio (well settled). As it happens with their neighbors, the Varduli, not a single toponym related to the Aquitanian-Basque languages has been found, further proving the theories about their possible Celt origin and possible late Basquisation.

They are not mentioned again in the Early Middle Ages, on their place appeared the precursors of the provinces of Biscay and Alava. Some authors deducted, following Classic documents, the existence of some ethnic affinity, collaboration, or political union between Caristii, Autrigones and Varduli, tribes who later would all be grouped under the name Varduli, this would explain all the later events on this region, for example, why once the Caristii and Varduli were moved out of their original territories by the Vascones in the Early Middle Ages, the Caristii and Autrigones lost their names and were grouped together with the Varduli. The union, whichever the causes, between Varduli, Caristii and Autrigones on a unique territory would later create the County of Bardulia, part of the Crown of Castile.

See also 

Pre-Roman peoples of the Iberian Peninsula
 Varduli
 Autrigones
 Cantabri
 Vascones
 Origin of the Basques

Notes

Bibliography
 Ángel Montenegro et alii, Historia de España 2 - colonizaciones y formación de los pueblos prerromanos (1200-218 a.C), Editorial Gredos, Madrid (1989) 

Pre-Roman peoples of the Iberian Peninsula
Basque history
Ancient peoples of Spain